Ave Caesar is a board game published in 1989 by Ravensburger.

Contents
Ave Caesar is a game in which a three lap chariot race involves playing cards and moving the distance.

Reception
Brian Walker reviewed Ave Caesar for Games International magazine, and gave it 2 stars out of 5, and stated that "Our normal definition for a two star rating is 'only if you are interested in the subject'. In this case modify that to read: 'only if you have designed a similar game yourself and are looking for some decent components'."

Reviews
Jeux & Stratégie #58

References

Board games introduced in 1989
Ravensburger games